Leslie Walter Chisholm (1 July 1888 – 21 April 1923) was an Australian rules footballer who played with Geelong in the Victorian Football League (VFL).

Notes

External links 

1888 births
1923 deaths
Australian rules footballers from Victoria (Australia)
Geelong Football Club players